Jeffrey Todd Fischer (born August 10, 1968) is an American voice actor known for his work in commercials, cartoons, and video games. He is also a vintner and the founder of Habit Winery in Santa Barbara, California. He is best known as the voice of Jeff Fischer on American Dad (2005–present).

Biography

Voice actor
Jeff Fischer attended the University of Arizona when he also started his voice actor career, his first gig being a Pizza Hut commercial.

Since 2005, Jeff Fischer has provided the voice of an American Dad! character named after himself, the character Jeff Fischer.

Beyond American Dad!, Fischer's other animation credits include the role of MC Cobra in Jackie Chan Adventures and a guest-starring role as Doug Reisman in Spider-Man: The New Animated Series.  Fischer played Lewis in a stage production of Blockage. In 2005, he announced the Teen Choice Awards.

Fischer has voiced several characters in video games such as Pimp My Ride, Tony Hawk's Underground and the Final Fantasy series, and has supplied voiceovers for hundreds of television commercials.

Wine maker
Jeff Fischer is a vintner and founded Habit Winery in Santa Barbara, California, in 2008. He got in the wine business at a time when he was going to auditions during the day and waiting tables at night. He started to study the production of wine, and to make wine in his own garage. In 1995, he released his first batch of 10 cases.

He lives in a trailer parked in the vineyards, does most of the wine processing himself, and works with the Coastal Vineyard Care Association (CVCA) to source his grapes. His wine was featured many times on American Dad, the first time was when Roger (the alien) made a grocery list containing Habit wine. The growth of his wine-making activity was fast, from 50 cases in 2009 to 1,300 cases in 2012, and 2,000 in 2013.

The label of Habit wines, a reaching hand, was featured at the San Francisco Museum of Modern Art.

Filmography
 Whisper of the Heart (1995) – Additional Voices (2006 Disney dub)
 Melrose Place – Gus (1998)
 Dinosaur (2000) – Additional Voices
 City Boys (2001) – Caller N#2
 Lilo and Stitch (2002) – Additional Voices
 Jackie Chan Adventures (2002–2005) – MC Cobra, Chip
 Sommerhitze (2003) – Jorg
 Spider-Man: The New Animated Series (2003) – Doug Reisman
 Tony Hawk's Underground (2003) (VG) – Brat Kid
 Tony Hawk's Underground 2 (2004) (VG) – Male Player Voice #3
 Sommersturm (2004) – Flasche
 Death and Texas (2004) – Football Guard
 Case Closed (2004) – Season 1 Episode 11 - Hotel Receptionist 
 Innoventions – Piggy Bank Adventure voice
 Buzz Lightyear Astro Blasters (2005) – Distressed Star Command Member
 Der Feigling (2005) – Gang Member
 Homerun (2005 short film) – Additional Voices
 American Dad! (2005–present) – Jeff Fischer
 Happy Feet (2006) – Additional Voices
 Pimp My Ride (2006) (VG)
 Onkel Dieter (2008 short) – Additional Voices
 Garfield's Pet Force (2009 video) – Additional Voices
 Infamous (2009) (VG) – Male Pedestrian 
 Lego Indiana Jones 2: The Adventure Continues (2009) (VG) – Coronado Sailor 
 Final Fantasy XIII (2010) (VG) – Yuj
 Final Fantasy XIII-2 (2011) (VG) – Yuj
 Doc McStuffins (2011) – Lenny 
 Chronicle (2012) – Thug #3
 Star Wars: The Clone Wars (2012–2014) – Petro, Trainer, Parsel
 Final Fantasy Type-0 HD (2015) (VG) – Eight
 iZombie  (2015–2016) – ep: 17 season 2 Additional voice
 Bob's Burgers (2016) – Walla
 Person of Interest (2016) – Season 5, Episode 7 - "QSO", Warren Franco (voice) (uncredited)
 Smurfs: The Lost Village (2017) – Additional Voices
 The Angry Birds Movie 2 (2019) – Additional Voices
 The Spongebob Movie: Sponge on the Run (2020) – Additional Voices
  Ozark (2022) – Season 4, Episode 5 & 12 – Sponsor
 Paws of Fury: The Legend of Hank (2022) – Additional Voices

References

External links
 
Official website

1968 births
American male video game actors
American male voice actors
Living people
Wine merchants
Place of birth missing (living people)